The Timebomb: Back To The Future Mixtape (also known as Guru's Jazzmatazz – The Mixtape Back To The Future, Jazzmatazz Back To The Future Mix Tape, Guru's Jazzmatazz: The Mixtape and other variations) is a commercial mixtape album released by Guru through 7 Grand Records, hosted by DJ Doo Wop and produced by Solar.   
Released soon after Jazzmatazz, Vol. 4: The Hip-Hop Jazz Messenger: Back to the Future, its press release describes it as "Guru's "raw" companion to the Jazzmatazz Vol. 4 album."

Track listing
"Intro (Don Gurizzy)" (2:03)
"Knowledge" (Featuring Lord Tariq) (1:56)
"7 Grand Ya'll" (Featuring Solar) (3:17)
"For Ya Mind" (Featuring Zion I) (2:20)
"Peace!" (Featuring K-Born, Highpower & Solar) (3:24)
"State of Clarity (Solar Remix)" (Featuring Common) (3:04)
"Who Got It On Lock?" (Featuring DJ Doo Wop) (2:21)
"B-Boy Kamikaze" (Featuring Tony Touch & DJ Doo Wop [a.k.a. Diaz Brothers]) (2:19)
"Too Slick" (Featuring Yungun) (2:20)
"So What It Do Now?" (Featuring Aceyalone) (4:07)
"We Got That" (Featuring Nature & Solar) (3:03)
"Jazzy Wayz (7 Grand Exclusive)" (3:21)
"Stand Up (Some Things'll Never Change) (Reggae Mix)" (Featuring Damian Marley) (3:08)
"Hot Like That" (Featuring Medinah) (2:36)
"No Need for Stress" (Featuring Mr. Lif)  (2:55)
"Back to the Future" (Featuring Caron Wheeler & C.Knowledge)  (2:58)
"Assasino" (Featuring Young Pablo) (1:58)
"The Game Needs Me" (Featuring Blue Scholars & Common Market)  (4:01)
"Feed the Hungry (Solar Remix)" (1:19)
"Can't Stop the Movement (7 Grand)" (Featuring Ms. Camille)  (2:32)

Guru (rapper) albums
Albums produced by Guru
2007 mixtape albums